Clemente Russo (born 27 July 1982) is an Italian amateur boxer, best known for winning gold at the 2007 and 2013 World Amateur Boxing Championships at heavyweight (201 lbs limit). He currently boxes for the Italia Thunder team in the World Series of Boxing league. He also signed up for the AIBA professional league, the APB, which launched in autumn 2013.

Personal life
Russo works as a police officer. He is married to former international judo competitor Laura Maddaloni; they have a daughter.

Career
Russo qualified for the 2004 Summer Olympics by finishing in second place at the 1st AIBA European 2004 Olympic Qualifying Tournament in Plovdiv, Bulgaria. At the Games Russo, who works as a policeman and who hails from Campania, fought at light heavyweight. He ran right into eventual winner Andre Ward from the USA and was eliminated early.

He moved up to the 201 lbs category and exited early at the World championships 2005 and the European championships 2006.

In 2007 he lost the European Championships final to Elias Pavlidis, at the World Championships he easily beat Englishman Daniel Price, 2005 medalist Alexander Povernov (PTS 17–5) and won the quarterfinals against Milorad Gajović (Montenegro) to qualify for Beijing.  He beat Chinese Yushan Nijiati to reach the finals where he edged out Russian top favorite Rakhim Chakkhiev 7–6.

In the 2008 Olympics he won the silver medal, losing the final round and so the competition to Rakhim Chakkhiev.

In the World Series of Boxing he boxes for Italia Thunder team. He received the "Winner WSB Heavyweight Individual World Champion 2011" and "Winner WSB Team World Champion 2012" awards.

Outside of his athletic career, in 2011 Russo debuted as an actor in the drama film Tatanka.

At the 2012 Summer Olympics, Russo again won the silver medal, losing the final to Oleksandr Usyk.

World Amateur Championships results
2003
Defeated Stefan Balint (Romania) 15–10
Lost to Magomed Aripgadzhiev (Belarus) 4–14

2005
Lost to Jasur Matchanov (Uzbekistan) 13–16

2007
Defeated Danny Price (England) 14–5
Defeated Lukas Viktora (Czech Republic) 17–6
Defeated Alexander Povernov (Germany) 17–5
Defeated Milorad Gajović (Montenegro) 15–3
Defeated Yushan Nijiati (China) 19–11
Defeated Rakhim Chakkhiev (Russia) 7–6

Olympic results

2008 (as a heavyweight)
Defeated Viktar Zuyev (Belarus) 7–1
Defeated Oleksandr Usyk (Ukraine) 7–4
Defeated Deontay Wilder (United States) 7–1
Lost to Rakhim Chakkhiev (Russia) 2–4

2012 (as a heavyweight)
Defeated Tumba Silva (Angola)
Defeated Jose Larduet (Cuba)
Defeated Teymur Mammadov (Azerbaijan) 7–1
Lost to Oleksandr Usyk (Ukraine)

2016 (as a heavyweight)
Defeated Hassen Chaktami (Tunisia)
Lost to Evgeny Tishchenko (Russia) 0–3

References

External links

List of exploits as a light-heavyweight
 

1982 births
Italian male boxers
Heavyweight boxers
Boxers at the 2004 Summer Olympics
Boxers at the 2008 Summer Olympics
Boxers at the 2012 Summer Olympics
Boxers at the 2016 Summer Olympics
Olympic boxers of Italy
Medalists at the 2008 Summer Olympics
Medalists at the 2012 Summer Olympics
Olympic medalists in boxing
Olympic silver medalists for Italy
Competitors at the 2005 Mediterranean Games
Mediterranean Games gold medalists for Italy
AIBA World Boxing Championships medalists
World boxing champions
People from Marcianise
Mediterranean Games medalists in boxing
Living people
European Games competitors for Italy
Boxers at the 2019 European Games
Boxers of Fiamme Oro
Boxers of Fiamme Azzurre
Sportspeople from the Province of Caserta
People from Caserta